Bear Garden Mountain is a forested mountain ridge of the Ridge-and-valley Appalachians in Hampshire County, West Virginia and Frederick County, Virginia.

Geography 

Bear Garden Mountain runs southwest–northeast from its northern terminus at Bear Garden run in northern Frederick County to its southern terminus at Mill Branch creek in Hampshire County, near Capon Bridge.

The mountain is bisected by the Northwestern Turnpike (U.S. Route 50) to the east of Capon Bridge and by the Bloomery Pike (West Virginia Route 127/State Route 127) at Good.

References 

Ridges of Hampshire County, West Virginia
Landforms of Frederick County, Virginia
Ridges of West Virginia
Ridges of Virginia
Northwestern Turnpike